This is a list of schools in Denbighshire in Wales.

Primary schools

Bodnant Community School
Christchurch School
Christ The Word School
Rhos Street School
St Asaph Infant School
St Brigid's School
Ysgol Betws Gwerfil Goch
Ysgol Bodfari
Ysgol Borthyn
Ysgol Bro Cinmeirch
Ysgol Bro Dyfrdwy (Cynwyd)
Ysgol Bro Dyfrdwy (Llandrillo)
Ysgol Bro Elwern
Ysgol Bro Fammau (Llanarmon)
Ysgol Bro Fammau (Llanferres)
Ysgol Bryn Clwyd
Ysgol Bryn Collen
Ysgol Bryn Hedydd
Ysgol Caer Drewyn
Ysgol Carrog
Ysgol Cefn Meiriadog
Ysgol Clawdd Offa
Ysgol Clocaenog
Ysgol Cyffylliog
Ysgol Dewi Sant
Ysgol Dyffryn Iâl (Bryneglwys)
Ysgol Dyffryn Iâl (Llandegla)
Ysgol Emmanuel
Ysgol Esgob Morgan
Ysgol Frongoch
Ysgol Gellifor
Ysgol Gymraeg y Gwernant
Ysgol Henllan
Ysgol Hiraddug
Ysgol Llanbedr
Ysgol Llanfair D.C.
Ysgol Mair 
Ysgol Melyd
Ysgol Pant Pastynog
Ysgol Pen Barras
Ysgol Pendref
Ysgol Penmorfa
Ysgol Pentrecelyn
Ysgol Rhewl
Ysgol Trefnant
Ysgol Tremeirchion
Ysgol Twm o'r Nant
Ysgol Y Faenol
Ysgol Y Llys
Ysgol Y Parc

Secondary schools
Blessed Edward Jones Catholic High School*
Denbigh High School, Denbigh
Prestatyn High School
Rhyl High School*
St Brigid's School
Ysgol Brynhyfryd
Ysgol Dinas Brân
Ysgol Glan Clwyd

 * Secondary schools with no Sixth Form.

Special schools
Tir Morfa School
Ysgol Plas Brondyffryn

Independent schools
Fairholme School 
Ruthin School
Myddelton College

 
Denbighshire